Tywan M. Mitchell (born December 10, 1975) is a former American football wide receiver in the National Football League who played for the Arizona Cardinals. He played college football for the Mankato State Mavericks.

References

1975 births
Living people
American football wide receivers
American football tight ends
Arizona Cardinals players
Minnesota State Mavericks football players
People from Crete, Illinois
Players of American football from Illinois

Minnesota State University, Mankato alumni